Teaserama is a 1955 American low-budget sexploitation film directed by Irving Klaw. It follows the performance of a burlesque show.

Plot
Teaserama is presented as a documentary film, with all actors and actresses playing themselves. It opens with Bettie Page assisting Tempest Storm with her brassiere. Afterwards, when the show begins, Page separates the acts by showing placards with the names of the acts. Stripteases are provided by Storm, Chris La Chris, Twinnie Wallen, Trudy Wayne, Vicki Lynn, and Cherry Knight. Stand-up comedy is provided by Joe E. Ross and Dave Starr.

Production
The film was directed by Irving Klaw, who was known for producing bondage photographs for distribution through the mail. Redheaded burlesque dancer Tempest Storm was cast for the leading role.

Playboy Playmate of 1955 Bettie Page, whom Klaw had previously directed, was cast as a second-tier dancer. Page, who had previously appeared in Striporama (1953) and Varietease (1954), performed three dance routines, including one alongside star Tempest Storm. Teaserama was the last mainstream film in which Page had a major role.

Vicki Lynn, who had also previously appeared in Varietease, appeared in drag in the film. According to film historian Eric Schaefer, Lynn's performance in Teaserama was presented with "the same degree of sensuality and tease as the strips by women" and as "erotic to heterosexual men". He considers the number a form of "gender sabotage" against the prevailing sexual norms of the time.

According to a review by Variety, the film was produced almost entirely without props. The majority occurs on inlaid linoleum with yard equipment visible in the background, although some sofas make an appearance. It was shot in Eastman Color. The film features little nudity.

Release and reception
Teaserama was released in 1955. It has since been reissued several times. In 1993, it was released as a video cassette, introducing the 1950s-era burlesque dancers to a new audience. In 2006, Teaserama was re-released together with Varietease as a double feature DVD by Something Weird Video under the title Bettie Page in Varietease and Teaserama. Bill Gibron of DVD Talk wrote that one of the special features on the DVD, a two-hour interview with sexploitation film director David F. Friedman about the history of the genre, was "far more fascinating" than the films.

See also
List of American films of 1955

References
Footnotes

Bibliography

External links

1955 films
American sexploitation films
Films about striptease
1950s English-language films
1950s American films